A list of films produced in the Philippines in the 2010s.

2010

2011

2012

2013

2014

2015

2016

2017

2018

2019

External links
 Filipino film at the Internet Movie Database

2010s
Films
Philippines